Eupithecia chingana is a moth in the family Geometridae. It is found in China.

References

Moths described in 1927
chingana
Moths of Asia